Nella is a feminine given name which may refer to:

People
 Nella Maria Bonora (1904–1990), Italian actress
 Nella Giacomelli (1873–1949), Italian anarchist
 Nella Larsen (1891–1964), American modernist novelist born Nelly Walker
 Nella Levy (1898–?), a pioneer of Girl Guiding in Australia
 Nella Simaová (born 1988), Czech former figure skater
 Nella Walker (1886–1971), American film actress and vaudeville performer
 Nella Rojas (born 1989), Venezuelan singer

Fictional characters
 the title character of Nella the Princess Knight, an American animated children's television series
 Nella, in the Italian fairy tale "The Three Sisters"
 Nella, a main character in the 1902 novel The Grand Babylon Hotel by Arnold Bennett
 Dame Nella Vivante, a character voiced by American actress Susanne Blakeslee in the 2005 video game Scooby-Doo! Unmasked

See also

Nela (name)
Nelly (given name)
Neila (given name)

Feminine given names